Vanessa Van Edwards is a behavioral investigator with Science of People and author of Captivate: The Science of Succeeding with People (2017). She is also a body language trainer specializing in science-based people skills. She runs Science of People, a human behavior research lab in Portland, Oregon where she studies charisma, influence and power body language.

Personal life
Vanessa Van Petten was born and raised in Los Angeles, California and attended Emory University in Atlanta, Georgia. She lives in Portland, Oregon with her husband and daughter.

Career
Van Edwards is lead investigator at her human behavior research lab, the Science of People. She conducts original research experiments on popular psychology and communication.

Van Edwards writes monthly columns for Entrepreneur Magazine and The Huffington Post. She is also a monthly guest on morning news show, AM Northwest. She has written for CNN, TIME, Forbes, and Fast Company.

Van Edwards teaches online courses about body language, facial expression, nonverbal communication and lie detection, all grounded in scientific research. She has also created/instructed some LinkedIn Learning courses, most of which are on first impressions and how to make conversations more meaningful and better.

Van Edwards has conducted a set of experiments on TED talks and presented her research at SXSW in March 2015. Her lab conducted research on the TV show Shark Tank and analyzed hand gestures in presidential inaugural addresses.

Van Edwards is the author of the books Human Lie Detection and Body Language 101, Captivate: The Science of Succeeding with People, and Do I Get My Allowance Before or After I'm Grounded with Plume under her maiden name, Vanessa Van Petten. Her latest book Cues was released in March 2022.

References

External links
 Science of People
LinkedIn Profile

Writers from Portland, Oregon
Living people
Writers from Los Angeles
Emory University alumni
1985 births